Roman Anatoliyovych Shchurenko (Роман Анатолійович Щуренко; born September 14, 1976 in Nikopol, Dnipropetrovsk) is a male athlete from Ukraine specializing in long jump. His personal best jump, which he achieved in July 2000, is 8.35 metres. The same year he became, surprisingly, the bronze medallist at the Olympic Games.

Competition record

External links

sports-reference

1976 births
Living people
People from Nikopol, Ukraine
Armed Forces sports society (Ukraine) athletes
Ukrainian male long jumpers
Athletes (track and field) at the 2000 Summer Olympics
Olympic athletes of Ukraine
Medalists at the 2000 Summer Olympics
Olympic bronze medalists for Ukraine
Olympic bronze medalists in athletics (track and field)
Competitors at the 2001 Goodwill Games
Sportspeople from Dnipropetrovsk Oblast